Célio de Castro (July 11, 1932 Carmópolis de Minas - July 20, 2008 Belo Horizonte) was a Brazilian politician, professor and doctor. He served as the Mayor of Belo Horizonte, the capital of the state of Minas Gerais, from January 1, 1997 until November 2002.

Célio de Castro died at Hospital Mater Dei in Belo Horizonte of multiple organ failure on July 20, 2008, at the age of 76.

External links 
 Folha Online: Former Mayor of Belo Horizonte, Célio de Castro, dies 

1932 births
2008 deaths
Mayors of Belo Horizonte
People from Belo Horizonte
People from Minas Gerais
Deaths from multiple organ failure
Workers' Party (Brazil) politicians